Mauritius–South Africa relations refer to bilateral relations between Mauritius and South Africa.

As both countries are members of the Commonwealth, the two countries are represented in each other's capital by High Commissions, with Mauritius having one in Pretoria and South Africa having one in Port Louis. Full diplomatic relations were established in 1994.

During apartheid, Mauritius only maintained a trade mission in Johannesburg, the country's commercial capital.

Trade
South Africa is one of Mauritius' largest trading partners.

References

External links

 Mauritius High Commission, Pretoria

 
Mauritius
South Africa